The National Emergency Operations Centre (NEOC) (German: Nationale Alarmzentrale, French: Centrale nationale d'alarme, Italian: Centrale nazionale d'allarme) is a government organisation of the Swiss Confederation based in Zürich.

The NEOC is dealing with exceptional events, especially where increases in radioactivity are involved. The NEOC is also managing incidents involving large-scale chemical accidents, as well as overflowing or rupturing of dams (the majority of electrical energy in Switzerland is produced as hydroelectricity). The NEOC is charged with ordering measures to protect the population in cases of emergency. It is part of the Swiss Federal Office for Civil Protection (FOCP) which in turn is a sector of the Federal Department of Defence, Civil Protection and Sports.

See also 
 Swiss Seismological Service

References

External links 
 Official website

Government of Switzerland
Emergency management in Switzerland
Antinuclear shelters in Switzerland